Green Island is immediately west of Adak Island in the Andreanof Islands group of the Aleutian Islands, Alaska. There are at least three islands named "Green Island" within Alaska.

Islands of Alaska
Islands of Aleutians West Census Area, Alaska
Islands of Unorganized Borough, Alaska